Mellor is a surname.

Notable people with this surname
 Alan Mellor (born 1959), English cricketer
 Anne K. Mellor (born 1942), feminist scholar of Romantic literature
 Chip Mellor (born 1950), President and General Counsel of the Institute for Justice
 Corin Mellor (born 1966), English silverware designer
 Danie Mellor (born 1971), Australian artist
 David Mellor (born 1949), British former MP   
 David Mellor (designer) (1930–2009), English designer
 David Hugh Mellor (born 1938), English philosopher 
 David Paver Mellor (1903–1980), Australian inorganic chemist 
 David Alan Mellor, curator and art historian
 Frank Mellor (1854–1925), English lawyer and cricketer
 Hugh Mellor (born 1938), English philosopher
 Jack Mellor (born 1906), English footballer
 Janine Mellor (born 1980), English actress
 John Mellor (disambiguation), multiple people
 Joe Mellor (born 1990), English rugby league player
 Joseph Mellor, founder of Mellor Brothers, a farm machinery manufacturer in South Australia
 Joseph Mellor (1869–1938), English chemist
 Julie Mellor DBE (born 1957), English Parliamentarian
 Karen Mellor (born 1963), winner of Miss United Kingdom
 Kay Mellor (born 1951), English actress
 Paul Mellor (priest), Kenneth Paul Mellor (born 1949), Anglican priest
 M. Mellor (active 1880s), English footballer
 Malcolm Mellor Australian glaciologist, after whom Mellor Glacier was named
 Marq Mellor (born 1968), American field hockey player
 Neil Mellor (born 1982), English footballer
 Oliver Mellor (born 1981), English actor
 Paul Mellor (born 1974), Australian rugby league player
 Peter Mellor (born 1947), English-born American footballer and coach
 Robert B. Mellor (born Yorkshire), British scientist
 Salusbury Mellor (1863–1917), British sailor and Olympian
 Stan Mellor (1937–2020), English jockey
 Stephen J. Mellor, American computer scientist
 Steven Mellor (swimmer) (born 1973), British swimmer
 Syd Mellor (born 1989), English footballer
 Thomas Walton Mellor (1814–1902), British cotton manufacturer
 Will Mellor (born 1976), British actor
 William Mellor (1888–1942), British journalist
 William Mellor (footballer), English footballer
 William C. Mellor (1903–1963), American cinematographer

See also
Personal name:
 Mellor Baronets
Place name:
 Mellor Glacier
 Mellor, Greater Manchester
 Mellor, Lancashire

References

English-language surnames
Surnames of Dutch origin